Mandav is a town and a nagar panchayat, near city of Dhar in Dhar district in the Indian state of Madhya Pradesh.

Demographics
 India census, Mandav had a population of 8,545. Males constitute 51% of the population and females 49%. Mandav has an average literacy rate of 32%, lower than the national average of 59.5%: male literacy is 41%, and female literacy is 22%. In Mandav, 20% of the population is under 6 years of age.

Mandva is situated in the Vindhyanchal Range at 2,000 feet above sea level. There is a deep ravine that separates it from the Malwa Plateau in Central India.  Mandav is 100 km from Indore, the nearest airport.

History

The history of Mandav, also known as Mandu, is known from the Paramara period in the 8th century A.D. Later it was under Mughal rule. They called it Shadiabad, which means ‘The City of Joy’. The monuments are a mix of the Hindu and Afghan style of architecture.

Mandu is a celebration in stone, of life and joy, of the love of the poet-prince Baz Bahadur for his beautiful consort, Rani Roopmati. The balladeers of Malwa still sing of the romance of these royal lovers, and high up on the crest of a hill, Roopmati's Pavilion still gazes down at Baz Bahadur's Palace, a magnificent expression of Afghan architecture.

Under Mughal rule, Mandu was a pleasure resort, its lakes and palaces the scenes of splendid and extravagant festivities.

Places of interest
This article needs to merge with Mandu, Madhya Pradesh#Places of interest
There are number of monuments in Mandav. Among the most important are:

The Delhi Darwaja and Hoshang Shah tomb

The Delhi Darwaja is one of the twelve gateways to the city and is made up of reddish stone. The Hoshang Shah's tomb is a fine example of Afghan-style architecture. It is said that four architects from Shah Jahan's court visited Mandu and took inspiration for the Taj Mahal.

The Jahaz Mahal and Hindola Mahal

The Jahaz Mahal, or the ship palace, resembles a ship sailing in water. There are two lakes, Kapur Talao and the Munja Talao, at the front of and behind the monument. The beautiful reflection of the palace can be seen in the tank waters. This was built in the period of Sultan Ghias-ud-din Khilji as a pleasure resort for his large harem.

The Hindola Mahal or the Swing Palace has been built with sloping walls, which make it look like a swing. This was used as an audience hall. There is a step well called Champa Baoli near it, which was connected to underground rooms with arrangements for cold and hot water for bathing.

Palaces of Roopmati and Bazbahadur

The palace of Sultan Bazbahadur and Roopmati are exquisite examples of the Islamic style of architecture. They have large courtyards. The palace of Roopmati was used as a check post in the times of an invasion. The tale of these two still resonates in the monuments of Mandu. Sultan Bazbahadur had gone to the dense woods near the Narmada River. Here he heard a sweet voice singing a divine song. When he reached the spot, he saw a beautiful maiden singing to the woods, the deer and the birds. He was mesmerized by her beauty and enchanted by her voice. When he asked her to become his wife she told him that until and unless the River Narmada starts flowing at Mandu she will not be able to marry him. This was because she used to pay homage to the river before having her food. The Sultan then went to the river and asked it to climb over the mountain and start flowing at Mandu. The river god granted his wish and told him to search for a sacred tamarisk and dig wherever it is found. There he found a spring of pure Narmada water which was a tributary. The king dug a reservoir at the place which was called the Rewa Kund. Rewa is another name of the river Narmada. He built a palace at this place and the waters of the fountain were provided to the baths of the palace.  The river can be seen at a distance, as a silvery shimmering line in the Nimar plains, from the palace. Bazbahadur was later defeated in a battle and fled from the battle field. Roopmati committed suicide after consuming poison. The balladeers of Malwa still tell you their story.

References

Cities and towns in Dhar district
Tourist attractions in Dhar district